Leslie is an unincorporated community located in the town of Belmont, Lafayette County, Wisconsin, United States.

History
A post office called Leslie was established in 1881, and remained in operation until it was discontinued in 1934. The community was named in honor of Leslie Johnson, the son of the original owner of the town site.

Notes

Unincorporated communities in Lafayette County, Wisconsin
Unincorporated communities in Wisconsin